is a former Japanese football player and manager. He played for Japan national team. His son Kempei Usui is also a footballer.

Club career
Usui was born in Fujieda on August 4, 1953. After graduating from Waseda University, he joined Hitachi in 1976. The club won 1976 JSL Cup. He became a top scorer and was selected Best Eleven in 1980 and 1982. He retired in 1988. He played 200 games and scored 85 goals in the Division 1.

National team career
On February 12, 1974, Usui debuted for Japan national team against Singapore. In 1977, he was selected Japan for 1978 World Cup qualification. He also played at 1978 Asian Games. Although he was not selected Japan after 1980 Summer Olympics qualification, he was selected in 1984 and played at 1984 Summer Olympics qualification. This qualification was his last game for Japan. He played 38 games and scored 15 goals for Japan until 1984.

Coaching career
After retirement, Usui became a manager for Hitachi in 1989. Although the club finished at the bottom place in 1989–90 season and was relegated to Division 2, the club won the champions in Division 2 in 1990–91 season and was promoted to Division 1. He resigned in 1992.

Club statistics

National team statistics

Personal honors
Japan Soccer League First Division Top Scorer - 1980, 1982

References

External links

Japan National Football Team Database

1953 births
Living people
Waseda University alumni
Association football people from Shizuoka Prefecture
Japanese footballers
Japan international footballers
Japan Soccer League players
Kashiwa Reysol players
Japanese football managers
Footballers at the 1978 Asian Games
Association football forwards
Asian Games competitors for Japan
People from Fujieda, Shizuoka